Hydriomena bistriolata is a species of geometrid moth in the family Geometridae. It is found in North America.

The MONA or Hodges number for Hydriomena bistriolata is 7238.

Subspecies
These two subspecies belong to the species Hydriomena bistriolata:
 Hydriomena bistriolata bistriolata
 Hydriomena bistriolata modestata Barnes & McDunnough

References

Further reading

 
 

Hydriomena
Articles created by Qbugbot
Moths described in 1872